Caroline Baillie is a materials scientist and specialist in engineering education, since 2017 the inaugural Professor of Praxis in the School of Engineering at the University of San Diego, USA.

Background
Baillie was born and educated in south-east UK. She has a Bachelors in Materials Technology, University of Surrey (1985). Her first job after undergraduate study was in public relations, and she resigned when asked to promote asbestos despite its carcinogenic properties. She returned to Surrey for a PhD in  materials science and engineering (1991). She has one son born in 2012.

Career
Her first lectureship in materials was in the Dept. of Mechanical and Mechatronic Engineering, University of Sydney (1992-1996), where she also took a Masters in Higher Education, which helped to fuel her developing interest in student learning. She was then lecturer in Materials and education development at Imperial College London, then deputy director of the UK Centre for Materials Education at Liverpool University, Liverpool, United Kingdom (2000-2003). She then became the DuPont Canada Chair in Engineering Education at the Faculty of Applied Science at Queen's University, Kingston, Ontario, Canada.

In 2009 she moved back to Australia, to the University of Western Australia in Perth where she held a Chair in Engineering Education and was Director of the Faculty Academy for the Scholarship of Education.
In 2017 she became Professor of Praxis in the School of Engineering, University of San Diego.

Media
Baillie was the host of Building the Impossible, a four-part documentary commissioned by the BBC in which a team of experts undertook the challenge of building historical inventions to their original specification to see if they really worked.

Awards and memberships
Caroline is co-founder and co-director, along with Eric Feinblatt, of Waste for Life, a network of scientists, engineers, academics, designers, and local communities working together to research, implement, and disseminate poverty-reducing solutions to specific environmental problems.

Baillie is also a member of Critical Stage Company, which is "committed to new writing, or tackling established pieces in a new way..." Through Critical Stage and the Integrated Learning Centre at Queen's University, she put on several productions using student and members of the Kingston community that linked to the themes of engineering and society.

She is also an associate editor of the Journal of Engineering Education.

Publications

 Dowling, D, Hadgraft, R, Carew, A, McCarthy, T, Hargreaves, D, Baillie, C.A. 2016. Engineering Your Future: An Australasian Guide. Wiley.
Baillie, C.A., Armstrong, R., Cummin Potvin, W. 2014. Mining and Communities: Understanding the Context of Engineering Practice. California: Morgan & Claypool.
Baillie, C.A., Jayasinghe, R.A., Mushtaq, U, Smythe, T. 2013. The Garbage Crisis: A Global Challenge for Engineers. California: Morgan & Claypool.
Baillie, C.A., Pawley, A.L., Riley, D. (eds.). 2012. Engineering and Social Justice: In the University and Beyond. West Lafayette: Purdue University Press.
Baillie, C.A. (ed.). 2012 Global Dimensions in Engineering: A Guide to Running Workshops for Engineering Students.  United Kingdom: Engineering, Social Justice and Peace. 
Baillie, C.A. (ed.). 2012.  Social Justice and Higher Education. United Kingdom: Engineering, Social Justice and Peace.
Baillie, C.A., Kabo, J., Reader, J. 2012. Heterotopia: Alternative Pathways to Social Justice Uk: Zero books.
Baillie, C.A., Feinblatt, E., Thamae, T., Berrinton, E. 2010. Needs and Feasibility: A guide for engineers in community projects: The case of waste for Life.  Synthesis Lectures on Engineers, Technology, and Society. California: Morgan & Claypool. 
Meyer J.H.F., Land R., Baillie C.A. (ed.). 2010. Threshold Concepts and Transformational Learning. Rotterdam: Sense Publishers.
Baillie, C.A, Catalano, G. 2009. Engineering and Society: Working Towards Social Justice, Part I: Engineering and Society. California: Morgan & Claypool.
Baillie, C.A., Catalano, G.(ed.). 2009. Engineering and Society: Working Towards Social Justice: Part II: Engineering: Decisions in the 21st Century. California: Morgan & Claypool.
Baillie, C.A. 2006. Engineers within a Local and Global Society. California: Morgan & Claypool.

References

External links
 Interview from the RSA (The Royal Society for the encouragement of Arts, Manufacturers and Commerce) Journal. April, 2003.

Academics of Imperial College London
Academic staff of the Queen's University at Kingston
Academic staff of the University of Sydney
University of San Diego faculty
Academic staff of the University of Western Australia
Australian materials scientists
Engineering educators
Living people
Year of birth missing (living people)